Framersheim is an Ortsgemeinde – a municipality belonging to a Verbandsgemeinde, a kind of collective municipality – in the Alzey-Worms district in Rhineland-Palatinate, Germany.

Geography

Location 
The municipality lies in Rhenish Hesse. It belongs to the Verbandsgemeinde of Alzey-Land, whose seat is in Alzey.

Neighbouring municipalities 
Framersheim's neighbours are Alzey-Schafhausen, Dittelsheim-Heßloch, Gau-Heppenheim and Gau-Odernheim.

History 
In 775, Framersheim had its first documentary mention when a document from Lorsch Abbey mentioned a vineyard in Framersheim.

Politics

Municipal council 
The council is made up of 16 council members, who were elected at the municipal election held on 7 June 2009, and the honorary mayor as chairman.

The municipal election held on 7 June 2009 yielded the following results:

Mayors 
 (1945–1946) Johann Beckenbach
 (1989–2004) Frank Zink
 (2004–2019) Ulrich Armbrüster
 (2019–today) Felix Schmidt

Coat of arms 
The municipality's arms might be described thus: Sable a kettle-hat argent pierced each side with a cord gules, itself nowed at each end and looped once in base.

The “kettle-hat” (Kesselhut in German) apparently was once typical. It appeared in the village seal as early as 1459. It could be a canting charge for the family Kessler von Sarmsheim who held the local castle in the Middle Ages.

Economy and infrastructure 
With local winemaking businesses, business is done by so-called self-marketers, who mostly market their own wares directly to end users.

References

External links 
 Municipality’s official webpage 

Rhenish Hesse
Alzey-Worms